Lora Kolodny is an American technology journalist. She is best known for her work covering electric vehicle companies and climate technology. She has written over 2000 articles for CNBC.com, TechCrunch, and other publications. She is also known specifically for her coverage of Tesla and is one of the journalists who Elon Musk has blocked on Twitter.

Career 
Kolodny's early journalism career involved writing for Inc. magazine, The Hollywood Reporter, and FastCompany. During this period, Kolodny also wrote for TechCrunch in New York as a cleantech writer and trends editor. She then covered the venture capital beat at the Dow Jones VentureWire and The Wall Street Journal for four years starting in 2012. While at The Wall Street Journal, Kolodny broke stories about the Thiel Fellowship and celebrities investing in startups. In 2016, Lora Kolodny rejoined TechCrunch as the publication's emerging technologies editor and video host. serving as moderator during TechCrunch Disrupt SF 2016. She later joined CNBC.com in 2017.

References

External links 

 Lora Kolodny on Twitter

Living people
21st-century American journalists
American online journalists
American women journalists
Year of birth missing (living people)
21st-century American women